The Book Café is a platform for free cultural expression in Harare, Zimbabwe, since 1993. Book Cafe operates in partnership with leading cultural NGO Pamberi Trust to offer both diverse entertainment to the public at large as well as a space for artistic development – especially a platform for younger artists.
book Cafe is known for its diversity of music and puts on a musical show almost everynight of the year.  Almost every artist in Zimbabwe has performed at the Book Cafe.

Background 
In the first eight years since the foundation, the Book Café organized 7,500 concerts and events, 650 public debates, 70 book presentations and 35 theater performances, and did it offer stage to 150 international touring acts. The Book Café was originally created by Paul Brickhill, in order for his band, Luck Street Blues featuring Miriam Mandipira, David Ndoro and his son Tomas Brickhill, to have a venue. Among the nearly 1000 concerts the band performed between 1995 and 2005, most of them took place at The Book Café.

The Book café has been called a free space, a liberated zone, an embassy of change.  It is a hub for artists – a place to meet, work, network and share ideas.  It is a place of free expression, of entertainment, of generosity. Book Cafe offers a space to eat, to drink to discuss – to enjoy music, theatre, fashion and film.  Book Cafe is also home to The Spoken Word and comes alive each and every month with Sistaz Open Mic and the House of Hunger Poetry Slam.

Book Cafe is becoming a Community Arts Centre -a space where artists and the public can meet each other, can connect with each other and share ideas and inspiration. 	

Book Cafe has been credited with the revaluation of many traditional forms of music, particularly of jazz fusion and African jazz. For instance did it result in the increase of popularity of the use of the traditional mbira by young people.

One fifth of the budget originates from sponsors and is being used to organize workshops and readings of for instance the Book Café Academy of Performing Arts (BOCAPA). The remaining income comes from the revenue of consumptions and entrance fee.

Temporary closure and move 
Book Café was served with notice of eviction from its revered Fife Avenue location in 2011.  From 1 January 2012 it ceased operating. That year events and concerts fell to 276 from a peak of 909 (2011, in twin venues including Mannenberg), since the theatre was closed for 5 months and operated partially for another 4 months. Mid-March 2012 the Book Café was reopened on a new location, at the Samora Machel Avenue on the corner of the Sixth Street. The opening was heralded by two five-hour concerts. The new theatre is bigger, and the Book Café bookshop, closed in 2008, re-opened late in the year. Book Café was the first African theatre to become a Prince Claus Award laureate.

References

External links 
Impression with photos

Zimbabwean culture
Musical theatre organizations
Theatres in Zimbabwe